Suharto Mangudadatu is a Filipino politician from the province of Sultan Kudarat in the Philippines. He previously served as Governor of Sultan Kudarat from 2007 to 2016, and again from 2019 to 2022.

References

Living people
Governors of Sultan Kudarat
Year of birth missing (living people)
Filipino Muslims